The 1973 PGA Championship was the 55th PGA Championship, played August 9–12 at Canterbury Golf Club in Beachwood, Ohio, a suburb east of Cleveland. Ohio native Jack Nicklaus won the third of his five PGA Championships, four strokes ahead of runner-up Bruce Crampton.

It was the twelfth of Nicklaus' eighteen major titles as a professional. At the time, the holder of the most major titles was the late Bobby Jones, with thirteen. As a lifelong amateur, his majors were the Open and amateur championships in the U.S. and Britain. Including his two U.S. Amateur titles, Nicklaus now had 14 majors, surpassing Jones. With his 12th professional major win Nicklaus also usurped Walter Hagen's record of 11 professional major victories. As of July 2021 these records still stand.

Sam Snead, age 61, shot even-par each day and finished in the top ten for the second straight year; he tied for ninth after a tie for fourth in 1972 and would improve on those in 1974.

This was the third major at Canterbury, which hosted the U.S. Open twice in the 1940s, both decided in playoffs. Lawson Little was the champion in 1940 with a three-stroke win over Gene Sarazen. Following World War II in 1946, the first U.S. Open in five years was played at the course.  Lloyd Mangrum won in the second 18-hole playoff round, one stroke ahead of major winners Byron Nelson and Vic Ghezzi.

Past champions in the field

Made the cut

Missed the cut

Source:

Round summaries

First round
Thursday, August 9, 1973

Source:

Second round
Friday, August 10, 1973

Source:

Third round
Saturday, August 11, 1973

Source:

Final round
Sunday, August 12, 1973

Source:

References

External links
PGA Media Guide 2012
PGA.com – 1973 PGA Championship

PGA Championship
Golf in Ohio
Beachwood, Ohio
PGA Championship
PGA Championship
PGA Championship
PGA Championship